Space Delta 18 (DEL 18) is a United States Space Force unit that serves as the National Space Intelligence Center (NSIC). It is headquartered at Wright-Patterson Air Force Base, Ohio and activated on 24 June 2022.

NSIC is a field operating agency that is responsible for performing national and military space missions and evaluating capabilities, performance, limitations, and vulnerabilities of space and counter-space systems and services. It is the Space Force's counterpart to the National Air and Space Intelligence Center (NASIC).

History 

The establishment of NSIC was ordered by Chief of Space Operations John W. Raymond. It will be formed by transferring NASIC's Space Analysis Squadron and Counter-Space Analysis Squadron from the Space and Missiles Analysis Group to the Space Force. Air Force Major General Leah Lauderback, the Space Force director of intelligence (S2)—to whom the center will ultimately report—led the planning effort. Congressional authorization is needed to create a field operating agency that reports directly to the S2.

Awaiting funding for the establishment of the NSIC, the Space Force stood up the Space Force Intelligence Activity (SFIA) on 24 September 2021 as an interim unit. SFIA served under NASIC until the establishment of NSIC. On 24 June 2022, NSIC was activated as Space Delta 18.

Symbolism 

The Space Delta 18's emblem design incorporates elements from the intelligence and space communities, its National Air and Space Intelligence Center heritage, and looks to the future. It consists of the following elements:
 Platinum is the distinctive color of Space Operations Command and represents the strength of its unified and civilian Guardians, the rarity of its calling, and the nobility of its mission.
The sphinx is an ancient symbol of wisdom, knowledge, and the challenges that the National Space Intelligence Center will solve. It is invoked out of pride in an organization that traces roots to the earlies days of intelligence. It sits omnipresent over the world – just like the space domain, gazing upward, drawing eyes from the past into the future and the blackness of space.
 The North Star's eight points symbolize points of a compass and displays how intelligence professionals will analyze and access to guide acquisitions, policymakers, and warfighters.

DEL 18 took on the number 18 in honor of the Space Force becoming the 18th member of the United States Intelligence Community on 15 January 2021.

Structure 
DEL 18 is composed of the following two squadrons transferred from NASIC's Space and Missiles Analysis Group.
  1st Space Analysis Squadron, Wright-Patterson Air Force Base, Ohio
  2nd Space Analysis Squadron, Wright-Patterson Air Force Base, Ohio

List of commanders

See also 
 National Air and Space Intelligence Center
 Missile and Space Intelligence Center
 Space Delta 7

References 

United States Space Force
United States intelligence agencies